Free Trade Party of Norrbotten is a local political party in Haparanda, Sweden. The party is pro-European Union and supports those who cross the Finnish border to purchase goods at lower tax levels.

In the 2002 municipal polls it got 248 votes (5.3%) and two seats.

References

See also 

 Finland–Sweden border

Swedish local political parties